Yoncalla (also Southern Kalapuya or Yonkalla) is an extinct Kalapuyan language once spoken in southwest Oregon in the United States. In the 19th century it was spoken by the Yoncalla band of the Kalapuya people in the Umpqua River valley. It is closely related to Central Kalapuya and Northern Kalapuya, spoken in the Willamette Valley to the north.

The last known user of the language was Laura Blackery Albertson, who attested to being a partial speaker in 1937.

References

External links 

OLAC resources in and about the Southern Kalapuya language

Kalapuyan languages
Indigenous languages of Oregon
Indigenous languages of the Pacific Northwest Coast
Languages of the United States
Extinct languages of North America
Languages extinct in the 1930s
1930s disestablishments in Oregon
Native American history of Oregon